Theodore Morrison  may refer to:
 Theodore N. Morrison (1850–1929), American bishop
Theodore Morrison (composer), composer of 2013 opera Oscar